Wyatt Earp's Old West is a computer game developed by Grolier Electronic Publishing in 1994 for Windows 3.x and Macintosh.

Plot
Wyatt Earp's Old West is an educational game within a multimedia encyclopedia. The package includes a “Shootout” game which is a stand-up arcade shooter. The bulk of the program involves wandering through the town, looking at things and listening to the narrator explain about life in the Old West. When the player leaves a building, the narrator asks a question related to something he mentioned about the room, earning money for correct responses.

Reception
The game was reviewed in 1995 in Dragon #215 by Jay & Dee in the "Eye of the Monitor" column. Both reviewers gave the game  2½ out of 5 stars.

References

External links
Wyatt Earp's Old West at MobyGames

1994 video games
Classic Mac OS games
Grolier Interactive games
History educational video games
Video games developed in the United States
Western (genre) video games